Huamanripayco (possibly from Quechua wamanripa Senecio, -yuq a suffix, "the one with the wamanripa")  is a mountain in the Vilcanota mountain range in the Andes of Peru, about  high. It is located in the Cusco Region, Canchis Province, Pitumarca District. Huamanripayco lies on the northeastern shore of Sibinacocha.

References

Mountains of Peru
Mountains of Cusco Region